The Academy of Public Administration under the aegis of the President of the Republic of Belarus, Minsk, is a higher educational establishment in the Republic of Belarus. The Academy of Public Administration was established in 1991 and it acquired the status of a presidential institution in 1995.

About Academy 
 History of Academy of Public Administration

The Academy of Public Administration under the aegis of the President of the Republic of Belarus carries out a course of managerial personnel training. It was established in 1991. Each year more than 6000 students, trainees and post-graduate students attend courses at the Academy. About 4500 civil servants also take their upgrading courses here. The Academy of Public Administration organizes traditional international and national scientific conferences.

Structure

Rectorate 
 Rectors
 Anatoly Shrubenko, Doctor of Economics, Professor (14 September 1992 to 3 April 2000)
 Peter Brigadin, Doctor of historical sciences, Professor (21 July 2000 to 14 November 2001)
 Peter Kuharchik, Dr.Sci.Tech., Professor (14 November 2001 to 25 April 2003)
 Stanislav Knyazev, Doctor of Law, Professor (25 April 2003 to 15 November 2007)
 Anatoly Morozevich, Dr.Sci.Tech., Professor (15 November 2007 to 2014)
 Marat Zhilinsky, Cand. Hist. Sci. (15 December 2014 to 18 May 2018)
 Hennadii Palchuk, Doctor of Pedagogical Sciences, Professor (18 May 2018 to August 2020)
 Viachaslau Danilovich, Cand. Hist. Sci. (since 21 September 2018)

 First Pro-rector
 Pro-rector on study
 Pro-rector

Institutes

Managerial Personnel Institute

Civil Service Institute 

 Organizational and Methodical Office

State Administration Theory and Practice Research Institute 
 State Administration Research Center
 State Human Resources Policy Research Center
 Education Technologies Center
 Center for the Scientific Support for the Automated Data System Reserve
 Listeners and Students Research Laboratory

Centers 
 IT Center
 Press Center
 Center for International Cooperation and Educational Programs
 Center for Upbringing and Youth Initiatives
 Trade complex of the Academy of Public Administration under the aegis of the Belarus President
 Publishing Center

International cooperation 

The centre was formed to promote Academy's international links and mutually beneficial contacts with related national and foreign educational and research establishments on the basis of bilateral and multilateral agreements and running programmes on cooperation aimed at task solution in managerial personnel training and re-qualification.

The Centre promotes Academy's cooperation with its partner institutions:
  – Academy of Public Administration of Armenia
  – Academy of Public Administration under the President of the Republic of Azerbaijan
  – Foundation “Slavyane”
  – China National School of Administration
  – Raul Roa Garcia Higher Institute of International Relations of Ministry of Foreign Affairs of the Republic of Cuba
  – College of Social and Administrative Affairs
  – Federal University of Applied Administrative Sciences
 :
 Academy of Public Administration under the President of the Republic of Kazakhstan
 Economic Research Institute
  – Academy of Management under the President of the Kyrgyz Republic
  – Lithuanian Institute of Public Administration
  – Academy of Public Administration by President's Office of the Republic of Moldova
  – Higher School of Management
 :
 Russian Academy of Public Administration under the President of the Russian Federation
 Lomonosov Moscow State University
 Moscow State Institute of International Relations (University) of the MFA of Russia
 Volga-Vyatka Academy of Civil Service
 Diplomatic Academy of the Russian Ministry for Foreign Affairs
 Moscow City Government University of Management
 Finance Academy under the Government of the Russian Federation
 Moscow Institute of Economics, Management and Law
 Murmansk branch of North West Academy of Public Administration
 Russian Customs Academy
 North-West Academy of Public Administration
 Orlov Regional Academy of Civil Service, Astrakhan State University
  – Singapore Civil Service College
 :
 National Academy of Public Administration under the Office of the President of Ukraine
 Odessa Regional Institute of Public Administration
 Kharkiv Regional Institute of Public Administration
 Khmelnitsky University of Management and Law
  – Academy of State and Social Construction under the President of the Republic of Uzbekistan
  – School of Planning of Ministry of Planning and Development of the Bolivarian Republic of Venezuela
  – Ho Chi Minh National Academy of Politics and Public Administration

37 agreements have been signed between the Academy and its partner institutions.

The Centre actively supports student and faculty exchange.

The Centre for International Cooperation and Educational Programmes provides assistance in organizing meetings between Academy's governing body and prominent international figures, lectures by representatives of foreign missions and international organizations held both for teaching staff and students.

Eurasian Association of Academies of Public Administration 
To sign authorized documents of Association it is planned in March, 2010 in Minsk.

References

External links

See also 
 List of universities in Belarus
 List of colleges and universities

Universities in Minsk
Universities and institutes established in the Soviet Union
Educational institutions established in 1991
1991 establishments in Belarus